Studa is an unincorporated community in West Middletown, Washington County, Pennsylvania, United States.

It is home to the Pine Bank Covered Bridge.

Unincorporated communities in Washington County, Pennsylvania
Unincorporated communities in Pennsylvania